Colin Hayward Gibson (16 August 1923 – 27 March 1992) was an English footballer who scored 57 goals from 288 appearances in the Football League playing for Cardiff City, Newcastle United, Aston Villa and Lincoln City. He played as an outside or inside right.

Life and career
Gibson was born in Normanby, near Middlesbrough in Yorkshire. His father moved to south Wales to work in the docks, and Gibson was spotted by Cardiff City playing football for a local team in Penarth. He assisted Cardiff City to the Third Division South title in 1946–47, before joining Newcastle United, newly promoted to the First Division, in the 1948 close season for a £15,000 fee. Despite rarely missing a game, Gibson was one of eleven players "considered redundant" in January 1949, and despite interest from Arsenal – manager Tom Whittaker said that "Arsenal are always on the look-out for real footballers like Gibson" – he signed for Aston Villa for £17,500.

He played for Villa for seven years, during which time he was capped for the Football League representative team against the League of Ireland XI in May 1949 in a 5–0 win. and received his first recognition for England, at "B" international level, a few days later against the Netherlands A team, in a 4–0 win. He signed for Lincoln City of the Second Division for a £6,000 fee in 1956, and a year later moved into non-league football with Stourbridge, where he ended his career.

Gibson died in Stourbridge, Worcestershire, in 1992.

References

1923 births
1992 deaths
Footballers from Middlesbrough
English footballers
Association football inside forwards
Association football wingers
Cardiff City F.C. players
Newcastle United F.C. players
Aston Villa F.C. players
Lincoln City F.C. players
Stourbridge F.C. players
English Football League players
English Football League representative players
England B international footballers